New Zealand competed at the 2015 Pacific Games in Port Moresby, Papua New Guinea from 4 to 18 July 2015. New Zealand qualified 49 athletes.

Football

New Zealand named a squad of 23 players.

Men
Coach: Anthony Hudson

Taekwondo
 

New Zealand has qualified 7 athletes.

Women
 Andrea Kilday -46 kg
 Zhanna Sattsaeva -67 kg
 Rhiannon O'Neill -62 kg

Men
 Nicolas Dorman +87 kg
 Dafydd Sanders -87 kg
 Vaughn Scott -80 kg
 Sean Wells -54 kg

Weightlifting

New Zealand has qualified 19 athletes.

Women
 Ruth Anderson-Horrell (69 kg)
 Kaeley Elkington (63 kg)
 Vi'ivale Gafa (75+ kg)
 Amanda Gould (63 kg)
 Tracey Lambrechs (75+ kg)
 Paige Lawgun (48 kg)
 Charlotte Moss (53 kg)
 Sheena Phillips (58 kg - reserve)
 Emma Pilkington (69 kg - reserve)

Men
 Andy Barakauskas (105+ kg)
 Ianne Guinares (62 kg)
 An-ti Hsu (77 kg)
 Richard Jones (105 kg)
 Douglas Sekone-Fraser (85 kg)
 Cameron Smith (77 kg)
 Caleb Symon (94 kg)
 Rory Taylor (105 kg)
 Anthony Taylor (69 kg - reserve)
 Vester Villalon (69 kg - reserve)

References

2015 in New Zealand sport
Nations at the 2015 Pacific Games
New Zealand at the Pacific Games